The 2019–20 winter transfer window for Italian football transfers opens on 2 January and will close on 31 January. Additionally, players without a club may join at any time. This list includes transfers featuring at least one Serie A or Serie B club which were completed after the end of the summer 2019 transfer window and before the end of the 2019–20 winter window.

Transfers
Legend
Those clubs in Italic indicate that the player already left the team on loan on this or the previous season or new signing that immediately left the club.

September-December 2019

January 2020

February 2020

Footnotes

References
general
 
 
specific

Italy
2019–20
Winter transfers